The Top Secret Life of Edgar Briggs is a 25-minute British television comedy series created by Bernard McKenna and Richard Laing and produced by Humphrey Barclay for LWT. It was transmitted on the ITV network in 1974 and featured David Jason as the inept Edgar Briggs, personal assistant to the Commander of the British Secret Intelligence Service who, in spite of his cluelessness (and ineptness), manages to solve case after case.

Cast
 David Jason as Edgar Briggs 
 Noel Coleman as The Commander 
 Michael Stainton as Buxton 
 Mark Eden as Spencer 
 Barbara Angell as Jennifer Briggs 
 Elizabeth Counsell as Cathy

Episodes

Reception
According to David Jason's biographers, Edgar Briggs  was not a ratings success in Britain but proved popular in overseas markets. Nevertheless, Jason reportedly vetoed repeat screenings of the series for many years on the grounds that he "[knew] how raw he looked in those days" and was "not at all anxious to share that with his public."

DVD release
The complete series was eventually released on DVD in March 2015.

References

External links
Comedy Guide - The Top Secret Life of Edgar Briggs at bbc.co.uk
 

ITV sitcoms
1974 British television series debuts
1974 British television series endings
1970s British sitcoms
Television series by ITV Studios
London Weekend Television shows
English-language television shows
Television shows set in London
Espionage television series